1985 in sports describes the year's events in world sport.

Alpine skiing
 Alpine Skiing World Cup:
 Men's overall season champion: Marc Girardelli, Luxembourg
 Women's overall season champion: Michela Figini, Switzerland

American football
 Super Bowl XIX – the San Francisco 49ers (NFC) won 38–16 over the Miami Dolphins (AFC)
Location: Stanford Stadium
Attendance: 84,059
MVP: Joe Montana, QB (San Francisco)
 Baltimore Stars win USFL Championship 28-24 over Oakland Invaders

Artistic gymnastics
 World Artistic Gymnastics Championships –
 Men's all-around champion: Yuri Korolev, USSR
 Women's all-around champions: Oksana Omelianchik, USSR, Yelena Shushunova, USSR
 Men's team competition champion: USSR
 Women's team competition champion: USSR

Association football
 NASL announces suspension of operations and hopes to return in 1986.  It never did.
 England – FA Cup – Manchester United won 1-0 (aet) over Everton. Kevin Moran of MU receives first-ever red card in an FA Cup final.
 Everton are crowned English champions for the eighth time, setting a then record points total for a 42-game programme under three points for a win.

Australian rules football
 Victorian Football League
 Essendon wins the 89th VFL Premiership (Essendon 26.14 (170) d Hawthorn 14.8 (92))
 Brownlow Medal awarded to Brad Hardie (Footscray)

Baseball
 Cincinnati Reds' player/manager Pete Rose breaks Ty Cobb's All-Time Hit Record of 4,191 hits.  Rose's record-breaking single was off of San Diego Padres pitcher Eric Show (September 11)
 Tom Seaver of the Chicago White Sox and Phil Niekro of the New York Yankees become the 17th and 18th pitchers to join the 300 win club on August 4 and October 6 respectively.
 Rollie Fingers breaks Sparky Lyle's American League career record of 232 saves.
 World Series – The Kansas City Royals defeat the St. Louis Cardinals 4 games to 3, becoming the first team to win the World Series after losing the first two games at home.
 Books published:
 Bill James, The Bill James Historical Baseball Abstract: A seminal volume of baseball history by the leading sabermetrician of the day.  He revised the book into a new edition in 2001.

Basketball
 NCAA Men's Basketball Championship –
 Villanova wins 66-64 over Georgetown
 NCAA Division I Women's Basketball Championship
 Old Dominion wins 70–65 over Georgia
 National Basketball Association
 1985 NBA All-Star Game
 1985 NBA draft
 NBA Finals
 Los Angeles Lakers win 4 games to 2 over the Boston Celtics
 Team moves
Kansas City Kings franchise moves, 1985–86 NBA season first Sacramento Kings season.
 National Basketball League (Australia) Finals:
 Brisbane Bullets defeated the Adelaide 36ers 121-95 in the final.
 United States Basketball League ( USBL ) was founded
Michael Jordan competes in his first dunk contest, wearing the first edition of his now famous line of "Air" Jordan basketball shoes.
 A first game of Liga Nacional de Basket, a professional basketball league of Argentina on April 26.

Boxing
 April 15 – The War: Marvin Hagler knocks out Thomas Hearns in three rounds to retain the world's Middleweight title.
 August 10 – Héctor Camacho defeats José Luis Ramírez to lift the WBC's world Lightweight title.
 September 21 – Michael Spinks beats Larry Holmes by a decision in 15 rounds to become the first world Light Heavyweight champion to win a world Heavyweight title.

Canadian football
 Grey Cup – B.C. Lions win 37–24 over the Hamilton Tiger-Cats
 Vanier Cup – Calgary Dinos win 25–6 over the Western Ontario Mustangs

Cricket
 Kim Hughes leads a "rebel" team of players on tour of South Africa, banned from official cricket since 1970 because of apartheid

Cycling
 Giro d'Italia won by Bernard Hinault of France
 Tour de France – Bernard Hinault of France
 UCI Road World Championships – Men's road race – Joop Zoetemelk of the Netherlands

Dogsled racing
 Libby Riddles with her lead dogs, Axle & Dugan, becomes the first woman to ever win the Iditarod Trail Sled Dog Race

Field hockey
 Men's Champions Trophy held in Perth, Western Australia, won by Australia

Figure skating
 World Figure Skating Championships –
 Men's champion: Alexander Fadeev, Soviet Union
 Ladies' champion: Katarina Witt, East Germany
 Pair skating champions: Elena Valova / Oleg Vasiliev, Soviet Union
 Ice dancing champions: Natalia Bestemianova / Andrei Bukin, Soviet Union

Gaelic Athletic Association
 Camogie
 All-Ireland Camogie Champion: Kilkenny
 National Camogie League: Kilkenny
 Gaelic football
 All-Ireland Senior Football Championship – Kerry 2-12 died Dublin 2-8
 National Football League – Monaghan 1-11 died Armagh 0-9
 Ladies' Gaelic football
 All-Ireland Senior Football Champion: Kerry
 National Football League: Kerry
 Hurling
 All-Ireland Senior Hurling Championship – Offaly 2-11 died Galway 1-12
 National Hurling League – Limerick 3–12 beat Clare 1–7

Golf
Men's professional
 Masters Tournament – Bernhard Langer
 U.S. Open – Andy North
 British Open – Sandy Lyle
 PGA Championship – Hubert Green
 PGA Tour money leader – Curtis Strange – $542,321
 Senior PGA Tour money leader – Peter Thomson – $386,724
 Ryder Cup – Europe won 16½ to 11½ over the United States in team golf.
Men's amateur
 British Amateur – Garth McGimpsey
 U.S. Amateur – Sam Randolph
Women's professional
 Nabisco Dinah Shore – Alice Miller
 LPGA Championship – Nancy Lopez
 U.S. Women's Open – Kathy Baker
 Classique du Maurier Classic – Pat Bradley
 LPGA Tour money leader – Nancy Lopez – $416,472

Harness racing
 North America Cup – Staff Director
 United States Pacing Triple Crown races –
 Cane Pace – Chairmanoftheboard
 Little Brown Jug – Nihilator
 Messenger Stakes – Pershing Square
 United States Trotting Triple Crown races –
 Hambletonian – Prakas
 Yonkers Trot - Master Willie
 Kentucky Futurity – Flak Bait
 Australian Inter Dominion Harness Racing Championship –
 Pacers: Preux Chevalier
 Trotters: Scotch Notch

Horse racing
Steeplechases
 Cheltenham Gold Cup – Forgive 'n Forget
 Grand National – Last Suspect
Flat races
 Australia – Melbourne Cup won by What A Nuisance
 Canada – Queen's Plate won by La Lorgnette
 France – Prix de l'Arc de Triomphe won by Rainbow Quest
 Ireland – Irish Derby Stakes won by Law Society
 Japan – Japan Cup won by Symboli Rudolf
 English Triple Crown Races:
 2,000 Guineas Stakes – Shadeed
 The Derby – Slip Anchor
 St. Leger Stakes – Oh So Sharp
 United States Triple Crown Races:
 Kentucky Derby – Spend a Buck
 Preakness Stakes – Tank's Prospect
 Belmont Stakes – Creme Fraiche
 Breeders' Cup World Thoroughbred Championships:
 Breeders' Cup Classic – Proud Truth
 Breeders' Cup Distaff – Life's Magic
 Breeders' Cup Juvenile – Tasso
 Breeders' Cup Juvenile Fillies – Twilight Ridge
 Breeders' Cup Mile – Cozzene
 Breeders' Cup Sprint – Precisionist
 Breeders' Cup Turf – Pebbles

Ice hockey
 Art Ross Trophy as the NHL's leading scorer during the regular season: Wayne Gretzky, Edmonton Oilers
 Hart Memorial Trophy for the NHL's Most Valuable Player: Wayne Gretzky, Edmonton Oilers
 Stanley Cup – Edmonton Oilers win 4 games to 1 over the Philadelphia Flyers
 World Hockey Championship –
 Men's champion:  Czechoslovakia defeated Canada
 Junior Men's champion: Canada defeated Czechoslovakia

Motorsport

Rugby league
1985 National Panasonic Cup
1985 New Zealand rugby league season
1985 NSWRL season
1984–85 Rugby Football League season / 1985–86 Rugby Football League season
1985 State of Origin series
1985–1988 Rugby League World Cup

Rugby union
 91st Five Nations Championship series is won by Ireland

Snooker
 World Snooker Championship – Dennis Taylor beats Steve Davis 18-17 in one of the greatest snooker matches of all time
 World rankings – Steve Davis remains world number one for 1985/86

Swimming
 First Pan Pacific Championships held in Tokyo (August 15 – August 18)
 July 21 – Switzerland's Dano Halsall swims a world record in the 50m freestyle (long course) at a swimming meet in Bellinzona, shaving off 0.02 of the previous record (22.54) set by USA's Robin Leamy four years ago: 22.52.
 December 6 – USA's Tom Jager takes the world record from Dano Halsall (22.52) in the 50m freestyle (long course) at a swimming meet in Austin, Texas, clocking 22.40.

Tennis
 Grand Slam in tennis men's results:
 Australian Open – Stefan Edberg
 French Open – Mats Wilander
 Wimbledon championships – Boris Becker
 US Open – Ivan Lendl
 Grand Slam in tennis women's results:
 Australian Open – Martina Navratilova
 French Open – Chris Evert
 Wimbledon championships – Martina Navratilova
 US Open – Hana Mandlíková
 Davis Cup – Sweden wins 3-2 over Germany F.R.  in world team tennis.

Volleyball
 Men and Women's European Volleyball Championships held in the Netherlands: both men's and women's tournaments won by USSR

Water polo
 1985 FINA Men's Water Polo World Cup held in Duisburg won by West Germany
 1985 Men's European Water Polo Championship held in Sofia, Bulgaria won by USSR
 1985 Women's European Water Polo Championship held in Oslo, Norway won by the Netherlands

Multi-sport events
 Sixth Pan Arab Games held in Rabat, Morocco
 Second World Games held in London, United Kingdom
 Thirteenth Summer Universiade held in Kobe, Japan
 Twelfth Winter Universiade held in Belluno, Italy

Awards
 Associated Press Male Athlete of the Year – Dwight Gooden, Major League Baseball
 Associated Press Female Athlete of the Year – Nancy Lopez, LPGA golf
 ABC's Wide World of Sports Athlete of the year: Pete Rose Major League Baseball

References

 
Sports by year